Okerlund is a surname. Notable people with the surname include:

Gene Okerlund (1942–2019), American wrestling announcer and former wrestler
Ralph Okerlund, American politician
Todd Okerlund (born 1964), American ice hockey player